

The Piper PA-8 Skycycle was a 1940s American single-seat light aircraft designed and built by Piper Aircraft at their Lock Haven, Pennsylvania plant. Towards the end of 1944 Piper announced a number of aircraft it intended to build after the war. One of these was the PWA-8 (Post War Airplane 8). An aerodynamic test aircraft was built with the name Cub Cycle and it first flew on 27 August 1944 with a small two–cylinder Franklin engine. The Skycycle was a fabric-covered mid-wing single-engined single-seat monoplane with a tailwheel landing gear. The fuselage was produced using an auxiliary belly fuel tank as used on the F4U Corsair. The Cub Cycle was scrapped and a similar but new aircraft was built with the name Skycycle, which first flew on 29 January 1945 using the same Continental engine as the Cub Cycle. The aircraft was further modified in 1945 with a four-cylinder  Lycoming O-145-A2 engine and designated the PA-8 Skycycle. No further examples were built.

A replica of the PA-8 Skycycle, the Carlson Skycycle, was built in 1995 by Ernst W. Carlson and produced by Carlson Aircraft of East Palestine, Ohio. Carlson intended to sell the aircraft in kit form, but no orders were forthcoming and the prototype was donated to the Piper Aviation Museum, since the original PA-8 was no longer in existence.

Specifications (PA-8)

See also

References

Notes

Bibliography

1940s United States civil utility aircraft
PA-08
Abandoned civil aircraft projects of the United States
Single-engined tractor aircraft
Low-wing aircraft
Aircraft first flown in 1945